"Jump to the Rhythm" is a pop song performed by Jordan Pruitt, recorded for the 2007 Disney Channel Original Movie Jump In!. It also appears on Pruitt's debut album, No Ordinary Girl.

Music video
The music video starts out with Pruitt walking on the sidewalk while singing. At the first chorus, she and others are dancing on steps to a house. Then she sits on the stairs plus it shows her singing on a fire escape. Then it shows all of those scenes at the end plus people dancing in the middle of the street. In between scenes of the video they show clips from Jump In!.

Chart performance
The song debuted on the Billboard Hot 100 chart of January 27, 2007, at number 69, becoming the first entry in the chart. The song eventually peaked at number 54 on the chart, becoming her biggest hit to date on chart.

Charts

In media
The song was also featured on the popular Nexon game, Audition Online, however, it was removed for unknown reasons. It is an unlockable song on High School Musical: Sing It!, and also as a karaoke version in EA's Boogie SuperStar.

References

Songs about dancing
2006 singles
2007 singles
Dance-pop songs
Disney songs
Jordan Pruitt songs
Songs written for films
2006 songs
Hollywood Records singles